Associazione Sportiva Dilettantistica Casteldebole Panigal 1919 is an Italian association football club located in Borgo Panigale, a suburb of Bologna.

History
The club was founded in 1919 as Società Sportiva Panigal.

In 1939, the club changed its name to Società Sportiva Panigale and later to Associazione Calcio Panigale.

In the 1942–43 Serie C season, the club finished second and, after taking part to the Campionato Alta Italia 1944, was admitted to the Serie B–C Alta Italia 1945–46. The club, however, finished last and was immediately relegated to Serie C. In the 1947–48 season the club finished 10th in Serie C and, due to reform of the championship, was relegated to Promozione, never appearing in a professional division again.

In the 1960s, the club reverted to its original name.

In 2007, the club merged with A.S.D. Casteldebole 1966, changing its denomination to the current one.

Football clubs in Italy
Serie C clubs
Association football clubs established in 1919
1919 establishments in Italy